The Baxter Memorial Library is the public library serving Gorham, Maine. It was built in 1908. The gift of James Phinney Baxter, the library building is constructed of pink granite and the interior is completed in red oak. In 2003, a  addition became the primary library.

References

Bibliography

External links 

Library buildings completed in 1908
Public libraries in Maine
Buildings and structures in Gorham, Maine
Libraries in Cumberland County, Maine
1908 establishments in Maine
Baxter family